Ishkhan Makharovich Geloyan (born 31 August 1992) is an Armenian professional footballer who plays for Russian club FC SKA-Khabarovsk and the Armenia national team.

Club career
He made his debut in the Russian Second Division for FC Slavyansky Slavyansk-na-Kubani on 26 July 2012 in a game against FC Mashuk-KMV Pyatigorsk.

He made his Russian Football National League debut for FC Khimik Dzerzhinsk on 13 July 2013 in a game against FC Baltika Kaliningrad.

On 15 June 2019, he signed a 2-year contract with the Russian Premier League newcomers FC Tambov. Shortly after he suffered an ACL tear which kept him out of action until March 2020. Tambov did not register him with the league for the 2020–21 Russian Premier League season.

International career
Geloyan debuted with the senior Armenia national team in a 6–0 2022 FIFA World Cup qualification loss to Germany on 5 September 2021.

References

External links
 
 
 
 

1992 births
People from Ararat Province
Russian people of Armenian descent
Living people
Armenian footballers
Armenia international footballers
Russian footballers
Association football forwards
FC Lokomotiv Moscow players
FC Gornyak Uchaly players
FC Khimik Dzerzhinsk players
FC Baltika Kaliningrad players
FC Yenisey Krasnoyarsk players
FC Neftekhimik Nizhnekamsk players
FC Luch Vladivostok players
FC Shinnik Yaroslavl players
FC Tambov players
FC SKA-Khabarovsk players
Russian First League players
Russian Second League players